The Rogers Communications Centre is home to Toronto Metropolitan University's RTA School of Media, Professional Communications and Journalism programs, as well as the offices for the Faculty of Communication and Design (FCAD). Completed in 1992, it is located at 80 Gould Street in downtown Toronto, Canada.

There are 3 High Definition television studios (Studio A, B, and C) and multiple audio recording and video editing suites. The building is home to the Allan Slaight Radio Institute. The RCC is also home to the newsrooms for The Eyeopener and The Ryersonian.

In November 2018 a new Creative Research Centre known as The Catalyst at FCAD opened on the 2nd floor of the RCC.

The building is not directly sponsored by Rogers Communications, although its naming is the result of a personal Can$12.5 million contribution to Ryerson by that company's longtime owner Ted Rogers and his wife Loretta in honour of Ted's father, communications pioneer Edward S. Rogers, Sr.

Research Labs within the Rogers Communication Centre 
The opening of the Catalyst at FCAD in November 2018 created a home for a number of research labs inside the Rogers Communication Centre. These include:

 The FCAD Audience Lab
 The Centre for Communicating Knowledge
 The Centre for Fashion Diversity and Social Change
 The Centre for Free Expression
 The CoLab
 The Colour Media Lab
 The Creativity Everything Lab
 The Documentary Media Research Centre
 The Experiential Media Research Institute 
 The Future of Live Entertainment Lab
 The Global Communication Governance Lab
 The Global Experiential Sport Lab
 The Infoscape Research Lab
 The Media Innovation Research Lab
 The Print Media Research Centre 
 The Ryerson Journalism Research Centre

References

External links
 Former Website

Toronto Metropolitan University buildings